Syed Akhtar Ali Shah is Pakistani police officer currently serving as Officer on Special Duty (OSD).

Shah briefly served as the Acting Inspector General of Khyber Pakhtunkhwa Police in 2017. In 2006, Shah was the first one who introduced the counter-terrorism policy in Khyber Pakhtunkhwa. He served in the Mardan Division from 2008 to 2011 against militants.

Shah got his LLB and Political Science (MA) degrees from University of Peshawar and a doctoral research in Political Science from Abdul Wali Khan University Mardan.

References

Pakistani police officers
Living people
IGPs of Khyber Pakhtunkhwa Police
Abdul Wali Khan University Mardan alumni
University of Peshawar alumni
Year of birth missing (living people)